Adel Fellous (born 16 February 1978) is a former professional rugby league footballer who last played for the Lézignan Sangliers club in the Elite One Championship. His usual position was prop-forward. He was an experienced French international who had previously played for the Catalans Dragons, Hull F.C. and Toulouse Olympique.

Background
Fellous was born in France.

Career
In 2008, he joined injury-hit Hull F.C. on loan until the end of March.

He was named in the France squad for the 2008 Rugby League World Cup and played in two matches.

References

External links
Hull FC profile
SL stats

1978 births
Living people
Catalans Dragons players
France national rugby league team players
French sportspeople of Moroccan descent
French rugby league players
Hull F.C. players
Lézignan Sangliers players
Rugby league props
Toulouse Olympique players